The Fighting Line is a 1919 American short silent Western film directed by B. Reeves Eason.

Cast
 Art Acord as Mart Long
 Mildred Moore as Mesquite Jones
 Charles Newton as Hereford Jones
 George Field as Mason Dalbur aka The Llano Kid
 Chris Enriques

External links
 

1919 films
1919 short films
1919 Western (genre) films
American silent short films
American black-and-white films
Films directed by B. Reeves Eason
Silent American Western (genre) films
Universal Pictures short films
1910s American films
1910s English-language films